Ulotrichopus pseudomarmoratus is a moth of the  family Erebidae. It is found in Cameroon, Equatorial Guinea, Kenya, Rwanda and Uganda.

References

Moths described in 2005
Ulotrichopus
Moths of Africa